Greece-Syria relations are foreign relations between Greece and Syria. Greece has an embassy in Damascus and 3 honorary consulates (in Latakia, Tartus and Aleppo). Syria has an embassy in Athens. Both countries are charter members of the Union of the Mediterranean.

History

Ancient
The first contact between the two Mediterranean nations started with Cadmus introducing Phoenician Alphabet to ancient Greece. In addition, Ugarit in Syria had also contact with Messinia and the Minoan civilization, until it was destroyed by the Sea People.

Hellenistic era
Macedonian Greek king, Alexander the Great conquered Syria and the region in 333–332 BCE. Afterwards, Seleucus led the Seleucid Empire to rule Syria, which lasted until 64 BCE. In Syria, Seleucids had many achievements such as building cities like Antioch, Laodicea, and Apamea, in addition to laying the foundations to the Aleppo Citadel.

Late on, the Byzantine Empire kept the Greek influence until mid-7th century, in which they developed the Norias of Hama. During the Byzantine rule, the Eastern Orthodox Church was the common religion between the two nations, which still has 503,000 members in Syria.

Pre-WWI
Both Greece and Syria were occupied by the Ottoman Empire for more than four centuries.

Modern era
During the WWII, many Greeks fled their country after the Nazi invasion, mainly from the island of Chios to seek refuge in Al-Nayrab camp, near Aleppo. During the Syrian Civil War, thousands of Syrians went to Greece and Europe to escape war in their country.

On May 8, 2020, the Greek Foreign Ministry Nikos Dendias announced a restoration of relations between Greece and Syria and assigned former ambassador to Syria and Russia, Tasia Athanassiou, as a Special Envoy of Greece's Foreign Ministry for Syria.

In July 2020, Syria initiated the construction of a Russian-funded replica of Hagia Sophia in the predominantly Christian town of Al-Suqaylabiyah.

Spring shield operation
After ending of Syrian offensive against Turkish occupation and balyun airstrike, Turkey asked NATO for help to launch a large-scale military intervention in Syria, but Greece vetoed Turkey's aid, thereby protecting Syria from NATO.

See also 
 Foreign relations of Greece
 Foreign relations of Syria
 Greeks in Syria

References

External links 
  Greek Foreign Affairs Ministry about relations with Syria
  Syrian embassy in Athens

 
Syria
Greece